In acoustics, a beat is an interference pattern between two sounds of slightly different frequencies, perceived as a periodic variation in volume whose rate is the difference of the two frequencies.

With tuning instruments that can produce sustained tones, beats can be readily recognized. Tuning two tones to a unison will present a peculiar effect: when the two tones are close in pitch but not identical, the difference in frequency generates the beating. The volume varies like in a tremolo as the sounds alternately interfere constructively and destructively. As the two tones gradually approach unison, the beating slows down and may become so slow as to be imperceptible. As the two tones get further apart, their beat frequency starts to approach the range of human pitch perception, the beating starts to sound like a note, and a combination tone is produced. This combination tone can also be referred to as a missing fundamental, as the beat frequency of any two tones is equivalent to the frequency of their implied fundamental frequency.

Mathematics and physics of beat tones

This phenomenon is best known in acoustics or music, though it can be found in any linear system: "According to the law of superposition, two tones sounding simultaneously are superimposed in a very simple way: one adds their amplitudes". If a graph is drawn to show the function corresponding to the total sound of two strings, it can be seen that maxima and minima are no longer constant as when a pure note is played, but change over time: when the two waves are nearly 180 degrees out of phase the maxima of one wave cancel the minima of the other, whereas when they are nearly in phase their maxima sum up, raising the perceived volume.

It can be proven with the help of a sum-to-product trigonometric identity (see List of trigonometric identities) that the envelope of the maxima and minima form a wave whose frequency is half the difference between the frequencies of the two original waves. Consider two sine waves of unit amplitude:

Instead, it is perceived as a periodic variation in the amplitude of the first term in the expression above. It can be said that the lower frequency cosine term is an envelope for the higher frequency one, i.e. that its amplitude is modulated. It can be noted that every second burst in the modulation pattern is inverted. Each peak is replaced by a trough and vice versa. However, because the human ear is not sensitive to the phase of a sound, only its amplitude or intensity, only the magnitude of the envelope is heard. Therefore, subjectively, the frequency of the envelope seems to have twice the frequency of the modulating cosine, which means the audible beat frequency is:

This can be seen on the adjacent diagram.

A physical interpretation is that when

the two waves are in phase and they interfere constructively. When it is zero, they are out of phase and interfere destructively. Beats occur also in more complex sounds, or in sounds of different volumes, though calculating them mathematically is not so easy.

Beating can also be heard between notes that are near to, but not exactly, a harmonic interval, due to some harmonic of the first note beating with a harmonic of the second note. For example, in the case of perfect fifth, the third harmonic (i.e. second overtone) of the bass note beats with the second harmonic (first overtone) of the other note. As well as with out-of tune notes, this can also happen with some correctly tuned equal temperament intervals, because of the differences between them and the corresponding just intonation intervals: see Harmonic series (music)#Harmonics and tuning.

Binaural beats 

A binaural beat is an auditory illusion perceived when two different pure-tone sine waves, both with frequencies lower than 1500 Hz, with less than a 40 Hz difference between them, are presented to a listener dichotically (one through each ear).

For example, if a 530 Hz pure tone is presented to a subject's right ear, while a 520 Hz pure tone is presented to the subject's left ear, the listener will perceive the auditory illusion of a third tone, in addition to the two pure-tones presented to each ear. The third sound is called a binaural beat, and in this example would have a perceived pitch correlating to a frequency of 10 Hz, that being the difference between the 530 Hz and 520 Hz pure tones presented to each ear.

Binaural-beat perception originates in the inferior colliculus of the midbrain and the superior olivary complex of the brainstem, where auditory signals from each ear are integrated and precipitate electrical impulses along neural pathways through the reticular formation up the midbrain to the thalamus, auditory cortex, and other cortical regions.

Some claimed benefits of binaural beats therapy may include: reduced stress, reduced anxiety, increased focus, increased concentration, increased motivation, increased confidence, and deeper meditation. Research is inconclusive about the clinical benefits of binaural beat therapy; it has been argued that it is best not to replace traditional treatments for stress and anxiety with this type of intervention until conclusive evidence is presented.

There are no known side effects to listening to binaural beats, although lengthy exposure to sounds at or above 85 decibels can cause hearing loss over time. This is roughly the level of noise produced by heavy traffic.

Uses
Musicians commonly use interference beats objectively to check tuning at the unison, perfect fifth, or other simple harmonic intervals. Piano and organ tuners even use a method involving counting beats, aiming at a particular number for a specific interval.

The composer Alvin Lucier has written many pieces that feature interference beats as their main focus. Italian composer Giacinto Scelsi, whose style is grounded on microtonal oscillations of unisons, extensively explored the textural effects of interference beats, particularly in his late works such as the violin solos Xnoybis (1964) and L'âme ailée / L'âme ouverte (1973), which feature them prominently (Scelsi treated and notated each string of the instrument as a separate part, so that his violin solos are effectively quartets of one-strings, where different strings of the violin may be simultaneously playing the same note with microtonal shifts, so that the interference patterns are generated). Composer Phill Niblock's music is entirely based on beating caused by microtonal differences. Computer engineer Toso Pankovski invented a method based on auditory interference beating to screen participants in online auditory studies for headphones and dichotic context (whether the stereo channels are mixed or completely separated).

Sample

See also 
 Autonomous sensory meridian response (ASMR)
 Consonance and dissonance
 Gamelan tuning
 Heterodyne
 Moiré pattern, a form of spatial interference that generates new frequencies.
 Music and sleep
 Voix céleste

References

Further reading

External links 
 
 Javascript applet, MIT
 Acoustics and Vibration Animations, D.A. Russell, Pennsylvania State University
 A Java applet showing the formation of beats due to the interference of two waves of slightly different frequencies
 Lissajous Curves: Interactive simulation of graphical representations of musical intervals, beats, interference, vibrating strings
 The Feynman Lectures on Physics Vol. I Ch. 48: Beats

Acoustics
Consonance and dissonance
Interference
Oscillation
Hearing
Psychoacoustics
Electroencephalography
Meditation
Auditory illusions
Sound

da:Beat